You Can't Believe Everything is a 1918 American silent drama film directed by Jack Conway and starring Gloria Swanson. It is not known whether the film currently survives, and it is likely to be a lost film.

Plot
As described in a film magazine, Jim Wheeler (Peil), believing himself hopelessly crippled, stifles his love for Patricia Reynolds (Swanson), the belle of society's favorite summer colony. A number of thoughtless flirtations have resulted in a few of the young men falling desperately in love with her. One of these attempts to force his love on her, but she leaps from his automobile. On the way back to the hotel she rescues Jim from drowning, the method he had chosen to end his life. She promises to keep his secret and, when accused of being in a roadhouse by the social leaders, she is unable to explain her whereabouts on the night in question. To protect her name, Haston Carson (Richardson) says that she was with him. In the meantime Jim has left with a medical specialist, to be cured or killed. He returns a well man just in time to save Patricia from social ostracism from her supposed indiscretions.

Cast
 Gloria Swanson as Patricia Reynolds
 Darrell Foss as Arthur Kirby
 Jack Richardson as Hasty Carson
 Edward Peil Sr. as Jim Wheeler
 George Hernandez as Henry Pettit
 Iris Ashton as Amy Powellson
 James R. Cope as Club Danforth
 Claire McDowell as Grace Dardley
 Grover Franke as Ferdinand Thatcher
 Kitty Bradbury as Mrs. Powellson
 Bliss Chevalier as Mrs. Morton Danforth

Reception
Like many American films of the time, You Can't Believe Everything was subject to cuts by city and state film censorship boards. For example, the Chicago Board of Censors cut, in Reel 1, view of young woman in low-cut gown after emerging from the water, Reel 2, closeup of man looking at young woman in low-cut gown, first two scenes of Kirby and young woman talking together and she is in low-cut gown, Reel 3, young woman taking off wet undergarments before fire, Reel 4, two scenes of Hasty letting sail down, the three intertitles "We can't stay here all night", "Why not, aren't you comfortable", and "You're mine, Pat, all mine", and first struggle scene.

References

External links

1918 films
1918 drama films
Silent American drama films
American silent feature films
American black-and-white films
Films directed by Jack Conway
Films shot in Los Angeles
Triangle Film Corporation films
1910s American films